was a Japanese actor.

He has served as President of the Mingei Theatre Company.

Career
After serving in World War II, he became interested in the theater and helped found the Gekidan Mingei troupe in 1950. He gained fame for his television work from the 1970s, but he also appeared in many films, especially those of Juzo Itami. His last film, Anata e, starring Ken Takakura, was released a few months before his death. He died of lung cancer at his home in Tokyo on 2 October 2012.

Awards
He won the award for Best Supporting Actor at the 1st Hochi Film Award for Brother and Sister, Kimi yo fundo no kawa o watare and Fumō Chitai.

Selected filmography

Films
Children of Hiroshima (1952) 
Dobu (1954)
Black Sun (1964)
A Man′s World  (1971)
Lake of Dracula (1971)
 Karei-naru Ichizoku (1974)
The Homeless (1974)
Brother and Sister (1976)
Kimi yo fundo no kawa o watare (1976)
Fumō Chitai (1976)
Rhyme of Vengeance (1978)
Hi no Tori (1978)
Nichiren (1979)
Kagemusha (1980), Yamagata Masakage
Dotonbori River (1982)
The Go Masters (1983)
The Funeral (1984)
Tampopo (1985)
Tokyo Blackout (1987)
Tokyo: The Last Megalopolis (1988)
Tales of a Golden Geisha (1990)
Childhood Days (1990)
Minbo (1992)
Spy Sorge (2003)
Casshern (2004)
Memories of Tomorrow (2006)
The Inugami (2006)
Dearest (2012)

Television
Minamoto no Yoshitsune (1966)
Mito Kōmon (1973)
Hissatsu Shiokinin (1973) (ep1 Guest)
Tsūkai! Kōchiyama Sōshun (1975)
Tokusō Saizensen (1977-87)
Shiroi Kyotō (1978)
Kita no Kuni kara (1981–1992) - Seikichi Kitamura
Dokuganryū Masamune (1987), Kosai Sōitsu
Hoshi no Kinka (1995), Shirō Morioka
Hachidai Shōgun Yoshimune (1995), Tokugawa Mitsusada
 Mōri Motonari (1997), Hanshū
Sakura (2002), James Takero Matsushita

Honours
Medal with Purple Ribbon (1988)
Order of the Rising Sun, 4th Class, Gold Rays with Rosette (1995)
Person of Cultural Merit (2011)

References

External links

1925 births
2012 deaths
Japanese male actors
People from Tokyo
Deaths from lung cancer
Recipients of the Medal with Purple Ribbon
Recipients of the Order of the Rising Sun, 4th class
Persons of Cultural Merit